1926 Országos Bajnokság I (men's water polo) was the 20th water polo championship in Hungary. There were six teams who played one round match for the title.

Final list 

* M: Matches W: Win D: Drawn L: Lost G+: Goals earned G-: Goals got P: Point

2. Class 

1. MUE 12, 2. BSZKRT SE 10, 3. OTE 8, 4. BEAC 6, 5. Bankszövetség 4, 6. Postás 2, 7. BAK 0 points.

Countryside 

1. MOVE Eger SE, 2. Szegedi UE, 3. Bajai SE, 4. Tatatóvárosi AC

Sources 
Gyarmati Dezső: Aranykor (Hérodotosz Könyvkiadó és Értékesítő Bt., Budapest, 2002.)
Sport-évkönyv 1926
Nemzeti Spoert 1926. 08. 02

1926 in water polo
1926 in Hungarian sport
Seasons in Hungarian water polo competitions